The 1991–92 Slovenian Football Cup was the first season of the Slovenian Football Cup, Slovenia's football knockout competition, and the last that was played by the old rules from SR Slovenia. All Slovenian clubs competed in their regional MNZ Cups, with eight winners securing their place in the quarter-finals of the Slovenian Cup. From there on clubs played by the East/West system to the final.

MNZ Cup Finals (round of 16)

|colspan="3" style="background-color:#D0D0D0" align=left|MNZ Ljubljana

|-
|colspan="3" style="background-color:#D0D0D0" align=left|MNZ Maribor

|-
|colspan="3" style="background-color:#D0D0D0" align=left|MNZ Lendava and MNZ Murska Sobota

|-
|colspan="3" style="background-color:#D0D0D0" align=left|MNZ Koper

|-
|colspan="3" style="background-color:#D0D0D0" align=left|MNZ Celje

|-
|colspan="3" style="background-color:#D0D0D0" align=left|MNZ Nova Gorica

|-
|colspan="3" style="background-color:#D0D0D0" align=left|MNZ Kranj

|-
|colspan="3" style="background-color:#D0D0D0" align=left|MNZ Ptuj

|}

Quarter-finals

|colspan="3" style="background-color:#D0D0D0" align=left|East

|-
|colspan="3" style="background-color:#D0D0D0" align=left|West

|}

Semi-finals

|colspan="3" style="background-color:#D0D0D0" align=left|East

|-
|colspan="3" style="background-color:#D0D0D0" align=left|West

|}

Final

References

Slovenian Football Cup seasons
Cup
Slovenian Cup